The spirit turtle or spirit tortoise is a turtle found in Chinese and other East Asian cultures. It is believed by East Asian cultures, like other turtles in mythology, to represent longevity. 

It is said to be chief among all shelled creatures.

Identification
Among the Four Intelligent Beasts, a list of auspicious animals, the turtle goes by several names.  Although it can simply be called "turtle" ( guī), it is also referred to as "old turtle" ( lǎoguī) and "spirit turtle" ( língguī). The latter is sometimes understood as being synonymous with "divine turtle" ( shénguī) although distinctions are made. 

The term is also used in reference to the turtle shells used in traditional divination.

China

The Erya  provides entries on the terms "divine turtle" and "spirit turtle". The former term includes an annotation which simply reads "the most sacred of turtles".

According to the Shuyiji ( Tales of Strange Matters) compiled by Ren Fang, a turtle that has lived for one thousand years has grown hair, a five thousand year old tortoise is called a "divine turtle" and an animal older than ten thousand years is called a "spiritual turtle".

The Baopuzi gives a slightly different account, describing the spirit turtle as one thousand years old. While the theme of longevity persists, the age at which the creature is recognized as a "spirit turtle" is in stark contrast with the account found in the Shuyiji. The text continues to describe the turtle as having five colors: blue, red, yellow, white, and black; together representing the five elements.

Japan
In Japanese mythology, the creature is identified as the Reiki ( "spirit turtle").

The Zenrin-kushū provides a kōan that reads Reiki o o hiku ( "The spirit turtle sweeps its tail"). It is described as a variant of the phrase Ato o haratte ato shōzu ( "Erasing traces creates traces").

The spirit turtle is an endemic motif at Shintō shrines and  Buddhist temples in Japan. The sangō title  "Reigizan" ( "Spirit Turtle Mountain") belongs to several temples across the country, including Tenryū-ji and Rinsen-ji in Kyōto, Hontoku-ji in Himeji, Daichō-ji in Uwajima, and others. 

It is said the Kameoka Hachimangū shrine at Sendai is so-called because a spirit turtle appeared at the time of its construction. Stone statues of the creature can be found at Zenyōmitsu-ji and Kameoka Hachimangū in Mashiko, Tochigi.

Reiki is also the name of the first era of the Nara period.

Korea
In Korean mythology, it is known as Yeonggwi.

Popular culture
 
Master Roshi from the Dragon Ball franchise is also known as the "Turtle Hermit" ( lit. "Turtle Immortal"). This title is inspired from the relationship between sages and turtles. 
The Spirit Turtle is a character in the Japanese light novel series The Rising of the Shield Hero
Linggui is the nickname of the character Grey α Centauri in the Japanese light novel series Infinite Dendrogram.
The puzzle video game Puzzle & Dragons features two skills, each called Pentagon – Spirit Turtle Dance and Tri-Guard – Spirit Turtle Dance. They are attributed to the monsters Dark Paths Guardian Genbu, Meimei and Awoken Meimei, respectively. The title of the former character is derived from the Japanese name for the Black Tortoise of Chinese astrology.
It is the name of a game piece in Taikyoku shōgi.

See also
Ao (turtle)
Bixi
Black Tortoise
Cultural depictions of turtles
Kashyapa
World Turtle

References

External links

Chinese culture
Animals in Chinese mythology
Four benevolent animals
Japanese legendary creatures
Legendary turtles